This family represents the internal ribosome entry site (IRES) of the Picornaviruses. IRES elements allow cap and end-independent translation of mRNA in the host cell. The IRES achieves this by mediating the internal initiation of translation by recruiting a ribosomal 43S pre-initiation complex directly to the initiation codon and eliminates the requirement for the eukaryotic initiation factor eIF4F.

References

External links 
 

Cis-regulatory RNA elements
Internal ribosome entry site
Aphthoviruses